Johannes Johannesen (born 1 March 1997) is a Norwegian professional ice hockey defenseman who is currently signed with Västerviks IK of the HockeyAllsvenskan (Allsv).

Playing career 
Johannesen hails from Stavanger and made his debut for his hometown team, the Stavanger Oilers, in the Norway's top-tier Get Ligaen in the course of the 2014–15 season. After his first full season with the Oilers, the 2015–16 campaign, he grabbed Get-Liga Rookie of the Year accolades. Johannesen claimed the 2015 and 2016 Norwegian championship with the Oilers.

His outstanding play in the GET-ligaen and the Champions Hockey League drew the interest of European powerhouses. In May 2016, he inked a two-year deal with Frölunda HC of the Swedish Hockey League (SHL).

In the 2018–19 season, with 6 goals and 23 points in 48 games and establishing himself as one of the premier blueliners, Johannesen would sign after the post-season to a two-year contract with Düsseldorfer EG of the DEL, on April 16, 2019.

Following the conclusion of his contract in Germany, Johannesen opted to return to the Swedish Allsvenskan, agreeing to a one-year contract with Västerviks IK on 1 June 2021.

International play 
His international play debut was with Norway in the 2016 IIHF Championship.

Career statistics

Regular season and playoffs

International

Awards and honors

References

External links

1997 births
Living people
Düsseldorfer EG players
Frölunda HC players
Leksands IF players
Norwegian ice hockey defencemen
IK Oskarshamn players
Stavanger Oilers players
Sportspeople from Stavanger
Ice hockey players at the 2018 Winter Olympics
Olympic ice hockey players of Norway